The Shenhe District is one of ten districts of Shenyang, the capital of Liaoning Province in Northeast China. Shenhe serves as the central district of Shenyang and currently hosts the seat of the City Government. It borders the districts of Dadong to the northeast, Dongling to the southeast, Heping to the west, and Huanggu to the northwest.

Administrative subdivisions
There are 10 subdistricts within the district.

Subdistricts:

Xinbeizhan Subdistrict
Zhujianlu Subdistrict
Huangcheng Subdistrict
Daxi Subdistrict
Shandongmiao Subdistrict
Fengyutan Subdistrict
Binhe Subdistrict
Wanlian Subdistrict
Danan Subdistrict
Wulihe Subdistrict

Transport

Rail 
Shenhe District is also home to Northeast China's main railway hub, the Shenyang North Railway Station (locally known as the "North Station"). The railways leading to the station forms the border between Shenhe District and the neighbouring eastern portion of Huanggu District. The station building has recently[when?] undergone a major overhaul and extension.

Road 
Qingnian Street is the district's primary north–south arterial road that links Beiling Park and Taoxian Airport, separating the southern portion of Shenhe District from the neighbouring southern Heping District.

Education
The Shenyang Saturday School (Chinese: 沈阳补习授业校; Shěnyáng bǔxí shòu yè xiào, Japanese: 瀋陽補習授業校; Shenyan Hoshū Jugyō Kō), a Japanese weekend school, was established in April 2006 and is located in Shenhe District.

Visitor attractions 
There is the Central Temple (中心庙; Zhōngxīn Mìao), built during the Ming dynasty, showing the center of ancient Shenyang. This temple is located just south of the Middle Street (中街; Zhōng Jiē), one of the most famous shopping streets and the first commercial pedestrian zone in China. Shenhe District is also home to the famous Wu'ai Market (五爱市场; Wŭài Shìchǎng), the largest light industry wholesale trading center in the entire Bohai Economic Rim.

Shenhe District is the site of the Mukden Palace, just south of the Central Temple. It is also the site of Zhang Zuolin's former home and headquarters, Shengjing Ancient Cultural Street. In the western Shenhe District there is a Muslim town, and the South Pagoda (南塔; Nán tǎ) is located in southern Shenhe District. There are a lot of high-end hotels located in Shenhe District, such as Sheraton, Kempinski, Lexington, Marriott (which is the first Marriott Hotel directly named "Marriott" in mainland China, but due to finance conflicts is not administrated by Marriott International). The iconic 305.5 m (1,002 ft) Liaoning Broadcast and TV Tower is situated alongside Qingnian Street.

References

External links

County-level divisions of Liaoning
Shenyang